Saeed Janfada (born 21 March 1964) is a retired Iranian football defender who played for Esteghlal, VVV-Venlo and the Iran national football team.

Janfada competed for Iran at the 1988 AFC Asian Cup.

Career statistics

References

External links
 Saeed Janfada at TeamMelli.com

1964 births
Living people
People from Tehran
Iranian footballers
Iran international footballers
Iranian expatriate footballers
Pas players
Esteghlal F.C. players
VVV-Venlo players
FC Eindhoven players
Eerste Divisie players
Eredivisie players
Association football defenders